Pixar Short Films Collection, Volume 2 is a 2012 DVD and Blu-ray compilation of the Pixar animated short films following the 2007 Pixar Short Films Collection Volume 1 and the 1996 Tiny Toy Stories. It features 12 shorts that were released from 2007 through 2012 and it includes some student films from Pixar's directors as bonus features. Volume 2 was released on November 9, 2012, by Walt Disney Studios Home Entertainment. It is followed by Pixar Short Films Collection, Volume 3, which was released on November 9, 2018.

Main shorts

Bonus features
The collection also includes student films by Pixar directors John Lasseter, Andrew Stanton and Pete Docter:
Nitemare
Lady & the Lamp
Somewhere in the Arctic
A Story
Winter
Palm Springs
Next Door

Story plots for student shorts
Nitemare
This is one of John Lasseter's student films made for California Institute of the Arts (Cal Arts). In it, a boy cannot go to sleep because he sees his furniture turn into monsters every time he turns out his lights. He keeps turning the lights on and off to see the monsters appear and disappear. Finally one of the monsters does not change back into furniture when the lights are on. The boy goes over to the monster and gives him a pop with his cork and string gun. The monster begins to cry and the boy lets him sleep in his bed with him. The lights go off again, and you can hear the sounds of furniture scuffing the floor. The light goes back on to reveal that all of the monsters are in the bed, which forced the boy onto the floor.
The Lady & the Lamp
Another of John Lasseter's student short films for Cal Arts, the film depicts a lamp shop owner telling all of his lamps to be on their best behavior because he is expecting an important customer. While he gets his shop ready, he accidentally pushes one lamp on the end of a shelf off into the floor, breaking the lamp's bulb. The lamp then goes to look for a lightbulb in a cabinet but accidentally screws in a bottle of gin. The lamp then pulls his cord to turn the light on but all of the alcohol goes down instead. The lamp, now drunk, begins to knock over the other lamps in the shop which causes the whole shop to be busted up. The shop owner comes from the back to see this mess just when the lady (the important customer) comes in. She does not even notice the mess but looks to see the one drunk lamp and exclaims that that is the perfect lamp. She purchases the lamp and the film ends.

References

External links

Short film compilations
Disney home video releases
Pixar short films
2010s English-language films
2010s American films